Jonas Coersmeier is an architect and designer, born in Germany and working in the United States.  He is finalist and first runner-up in the World Trade Center Memorial Competition.  He was born in Cologne, Germany and studied architecture at Columbia University, M.I.T. and Technische Universität Darmstadt.  He teaches at the Pratt Institute School of Architecture, where he coordinates the Architecture and Urban Design program (MSAUD,) University of Pennsylvania School of Design and University of Kassel School of Architecture, where he was head of the Digital Design Department.

References

External links 
 nytimes.com
 bbcaa.com
 coersmeier.org
 wtcsitememorial.org
 de.wikipedia.org

Columbia Graduate School of Architecture, Planning and Preservation alumni
MIT School of Architecture and Planning alumni
21st-century German architects
Year of birth missing (living people)
Living people
University of Pennsylvania faculty
Pratt Institute faculty
Academic staff of the University of Kassel
Architecture educators

Technische Universität Darmstadt alumni
Architects from Cologne